Irene Reid (September 23, 1930 – January 5, 2008) was an American jazz singer.

Early life 
Reid was born and raised in Savannah, Georgia. She sang in church and in high school in Georgia, and moved to New York City in 1947 after her mother died.

Career 
Toward the end of 1947, she tried out for an amateur contest at the Apollo Theater in Harlem, and won the competition for five straight weeks. Soon after she was offered a slot as the featured vocalist with Dick Vance at the Savoy Ballroom, which she held from 1948 to 1950.

In 1961–62, Reid sang with Count Basie's orchestra, and recorded for Verve Records. Her debut for Verve, Room for One More (1965), arranged and conducted by Oliver Nelson and engineered by Rudy Van Gelder, featured many of the leading musicians of the day: Charlie Mariano, Jerome Richardson, Phil Woods, Jerry Dodgion, Thad Jones, Joe Newman, Jimmy Cleveland, Urbie Green, J.J. Johnson, Kenny Burrell, Bob Cranshaw, Roger Kellaway and Grady Tate.

She later performed in a Broadway production of the musical The Wiz. Additionally, she sang with Carmen McRae, Sarah Vaughan, Aretha Franklin, and B.B. King. Reid receded from fame in the 1970s and 1980s, but launched a comeback near the end of that decade. She appeared at the Savannah Jazz Festival in 1991, 1994, and 1996, and continued releasing albums on Savant Records in the 1990s and 2000s.

Discography
 It's Only the Beginning (MGM, 1963)
 Room for One More (Verve, 1965)
 It's Too Late (Verve, 1966)
 A Man Only Does (What a Woman Makes Him Do) (Verve, 1967)
 I've Been Here All The Time... (Barry, 1968)
 The World Needs What I Need (Polydor, 1970)
 Two of Us (Glades, 1976)
 The Lady from Savannah (Birdland, 1989)
 Million Dollar Secret (Savant, 1997)
 I Ain't Doing Too Bad (Savant, 1999)
 The Uptown Lowdown (Savant, 2000)
 One Monkey Don't Stop No Show (Savant, 2002)
 Movin' Out (Savant, 2003)
 Thanks to You (Savant, 2004)
 The Queen of the Party: The Uptown Blues of Irene Reid (Savant, 2012)

With Count Basie
 Back with Basie (Roulette, 1962)
 Basie in Sweden (Roulette, 1962)

Death 
She died on January 5, 2008, from a cardiac arrest, aged 77.

References

External links
[ Irene Reid] at Allmusic

1930 births
2008 deaths
American jazz singers
Singers from Georgia (U.S. state)
20th-century American singers